Kwanka, or Kwang (Kwaŋ), is a dialect cluster of Plateau languages in Nigeria.

Varieties

Kwang or Vaghat is the main variety. Others are Ya (Tiyaa) and Bijim.

Vaghat is perceived as distinct from Kadung. Mutual intelligibility between Vaghat/Kadung, Ya and Bijim is fairly low.

Kwang and Ya are endonyms, with loconyms Kadun and Kwanka for Kwang and Boi for Ya.

Distribution
The main settlements are Càmpàk, Kwànkà, Làrkà, Bùkòʃì, Wùyà, Gileŋ, Kùmbùl, Kaduŋ, Wùʃìmà, ɗə̀kdèy, Kwándarì, Rɔ̀k, Jàrkàn, Dùfyàm, Mícìji, and others. They are located in Pankshin LGA and Mangu LGA, Plateau State. Surrounding languages are Mwaghavul, Ngas, Pyem, and Fulani.

Vaghat

The Vaghat originally lived in the following hill settlements in Tafawa Balewa and Bogoro LGAs in southwestern Bauchi State.

Akusha
Anjere (no longer inhabited)
Aruti
Dala
Goŋzi
Gwoɓi (no longer inhabited). There is a cave where the skulls of Vaghat ancestors are kept.
Kaduk (no longer inhabited)
Kudal (central village where the chief lived)
Kwafa
Maŋgar
Yaghap
Yalas
Yaŋ
Yɔghɔs (Yaush)
Yise
Zhindir

Today, the Vaghat have also moved to many towns and settlements spread across Bauchi State, Plateau State, and Kaduna State (mostly near Zaria).

Vaghat highland clans are: Āyàlàs, Àyìtūr, Àtòròk, Āyīpàɣí, Āyīgònì, Àyàkdàl, Àyánàvēr, Āyàtōl, Àyàʒíkʔìn, Àyìʤìlìŋ, Áyàshàlà, and Àzàrā.

Vaghat lowland clans are: Āyàlàs, Àyàkdàl, Àyàʒíkʔìn, Àyàgwàr, and Àyàgyēr.

The Vaghat people also have a cave in a mountain where they keep the skulls of their ancestors.

Further reading
 Blench, Roger. 2021. The Kwaŋ language of Central Nigeria and its affinities. Cambridge: Kay Williamson Educational Foundation.
 Blench, Roger. 2022. The Vaghat language of Central Nigeria. Cambridge: Kay Williamson Educational Foundation.
 Blench, Roger. 2022. Skull-cults and soul arrows: the religion of the Vaghat people. Cambridge: Kay Williamson Educational Foundation.

References

Tarokoid languages
Languages of Nigeria